The City Line is a bus rapid transit (BRT) line in Spokane, Washington, United States, that is currently under construction with service expected to begin in July 2023. The  route, which will be operated by the Spokane Transit Authority, will run from Spokane's Browne's Addition neighborhood, through Downtown Spokane and the University District, including the WSU Health Sciences campus and Gonzaga University, before ending at the Spokane Community College campus in the Chief Garry Park neighborhood.

The line is projected to carry 1 million passengers annually.

Originally scheduled to open in 2022, the opening was revised in October 2021, during construction, to July 2023 due to supply chain shortages in the materials, specifically rolled steel tubes, needed to construct the station shelters.

History

Origins
Rail-based urban transportation had historically been a part of Spokane's development in the early 20th century, with numerous streetcars and trolleys running through the city's core.  However, as the automobile gained in popularity throughout the century, the streetcars and their tracks were eventually phased out in favor of buses. In 1999, a revival of rail transit in Spokane was discussed, with vision documents calling for the development of a modern streetcar line in Downtown Spokane. Spokane Transit Authority officially adopted the vision as a project in 2005, commissioning a streetcar feasibility study in partnership with other local transportation and planning agencies which was released in 2006.

Planning

Public workshops and a series of meetings with stakeholders were held from 2010 through early 2011 to identify preferred mode and route alternatives for the new line. The Spokane City Council voted in July 2011 to identify a locally preferred alternative of implementing a tire-based electric trolleybus system, in lieu of a more expensive track-based streetcar system, and a route from the Browne's Addition neighborhood toward Spokane Community College through Downtown Spokane and the nearby University District.

By 2014, plans to use a modern electric trolley as the mode of transportation shifted to using battery electric buses instead due to the lower costs—no overhead wires would need to be constructed—and the rapidly developing capability and reliability of electric vehicles.

Funding
The City Line's final estimated development costs of $92.2 million are funded through a variety of local, state, and federal sources.

Costs during the project's earlier stages were initially estimated to be around $72 million.  $3.575 million of that amount went toward the project's planning and design and were funded by state and federal sources. In 2015, the Washington State Legislature allocated $15 million toward the project. At the time, the intent was that the remainder of that $72 million would be covered through a federal grant, which Spokane Transit applied for in September 2017. STA was awarded its $53.4 million request from the Federal Transit Administration (FTA) Small Starts Grant in April 2019, which would have fully funded the project when combined with the earlier allocation by the Washington State Legislature in 2015.

However, due to cost escalation since the initial planning and grant applications began, the cost estimate had increased to between $85.7 and $92.2 million.  To address the shortfall, the Spokane Transit Authority board authorized in July 2019 a $20.2 million local match as part of the transit agency's agreement with the FTA to accept the federal grant.

The line's operating costs will be covered by fare revenue and sales-tax revenue approved in 2016 as part of STA's Proposition 1 to improve transit service throughout the Spokane area.

Naming

The project was conceived under the working title "Central City Line" and was officially named the City Line at the FTA grant signing ceremony on January 21, 2020.

Construction
Major construction of the line's components, including roadway improvements along the route, supporting infrastructure, and boarding stations, began on May 1, 2020 and will continue through 2021.  Prior to start of this phase, Spokane Transit completed upgrades at some of its existing facilities that will ultimately enable and support City Line operations, including alterations to boarding zones at the STA Plaza, reconstruction of the Spokane Community College Transit Center, and constructing a new garage at STA's main campus that will house, service, and recharge the City Line's electric battery electric fleet when not in use.

Route
The line will begin in the Browne's Addition neighborhood just west of Downtown Spokane, run through the core of downtown, continuing eastward through the University District, and ultimately ending at Spokane Community College in the Chief Garry Park neighborhood.

Stations
All stops and stations will feature near-level boarding, real-time information, fare validators, off-board ticketing, and either a shelter or windscreen.

Vehicles

The City Line will utilize 60-foot long New Flyer Xcelsior CHARGE battery electric buses.  A $13.9 million purchase for 10 buses was approved by the Spokane Transit Board of Directors on April 16, 2020.  Spokane Transit planned to take delivery of the first of the buses in Q2 2021 for testing with the remaining 9 vehicles delivered toward the end of 2021, in time for the start of City Line operations in 2022.  However, it ended up taking delivery of the first bus ahead of schedule in December 2020, publicly revealing it for the first time in March 2021.

The buses will feature a special black and purple livery and have five doors—three on the right and two on the left to support the interoperability between side-boarding platforms and center-boarding platforms along the route.

References

External links

City Line
City Line Construction
STA Moving Forward - Central City Line

Bus transportation in Washington (state)
Bus rapid transit in Washington (state)
Transportation in Spokane, Washington
Spokane, Washington